Al-Husayn ibn al-Qasim was a senior official of the Abbasid Caliphate who served as vizier from September 931 until May 932.

Life
Hailing from the Banu Wahb, a family of Nestorian Christian origin that had served in the caliphal bureaucracy since late Umayyad times, al-Husayn was the son, grandson and great-grandson of viziers. The family however had lost power after the death of al-Husayn's father al-Qasim in 904. 

He was appointed to the vizierate and the title of Amid al-Dawla ("Mainstay/Pillar of the State") by Caliph al-Muqtadir in September 931, with the support of the Banu'l-Furat faction against the rival faction around Ali ibn Isa al-Jarrah and the commander-in-chief Mu'nis al-Muzaffar. He quickly managed to win over Mu'nis' proteges, the chamberlain Muhammad ibn Ra'iq and his brother Ibrahim, and began plotting against Mu'nis. The latter tried to secure his dismissal from the caliph, and almost succeeded; it was only his demand that al-Husayn be exiled to Oman that made al-Muqtadir oppose it. At the same time, al-Husayn felt so threatened by the powerful general that he slept in a different house each night to prevent his arrest.

According to the scholar C.E. Bosworth, al-Husayn was "perhaps the last vizier to  attempt to retain for the vizierate a measure of its former independence". He tried to restore the state finances, but fell from power due to the incessant court rivalries in May 932.

References

Sources
 
 

9th-century births
10th-century deaths
Viziers of the Abbasid Caliphate
Banu Wahb
10th-century people from the Abbasid Caliphate
9th-century Arabs
10th-century Arabs